Pierre Cullaz (21 July 1935 – 1 January 2014) was a French jazz guitarist and cellist.

Pierre Cullaz was the son of Maurice Cullaz, a jazz writer, and the older brother of Alby Cullaz. After he learned piano and cello in 1949, he moved to guitar as his main instrument.

In 1955, he started his professional career with Dexter Gordon, Johnny Griffin, and Hal Singer. Two years later he worked with Michel Hausser, then Sarah Vaughan, Claude Bolling and Stéphane Grappelli. After military service, he became a studio musician. He worked with Martial Solal and Eddy Louiss and beginning in 1965 was a member of the band Guitars Unlimited. He formed Guitars Unlimited with Victor Apicella, Raymond Gimenez, Francis Lemageur, and Tony Rallo. The band recorded for Barclay. Other collaborators included Elvin Jones, Andre Hodeir, Ivan Jullien, Guy Lafitte. Cullaz also taught guitar and wrote a method book.

He accompanied singer Claude Nougaro and was a film composer for  Michel Legrand. Beside being a musician, he taught at the CIM in Paris and wrote the textbook Methode de Guitare.

Sources
 Cook, Richard and Morton, Brian. The Penguin Guide to Jazz Recordings, 8th Edition, London, Penguin, 2006 
 Feather, Leonard and Gitler, Ira. The Biographical Encyclopedia of Jazz. Oxford/New York, 1999

References

External links
Portrait at Midi Libre

1935 births
2014 deaths
Musicians from Paris
French jazz guitarists
French male guitarists
French cellists
20th-century French musicians
20th-century guitarists
20th-century French male musicians
French male jazz musicians
20th-century cellists